is a Shinto shrine located in the jurisdiction of Tanabe, Wakayama, deep in the rugged mountains of the southeast Kii Peninsula of Japan. It is included as part of the Kumano Sanzan in the World Heritage Site "Sacred Sites and Pilgrimage Routes in the Kii Mountain Range".  The main deity enshrined is Kumano Gongen (熊野権現).  All of the ancient Kumano Kodō routes lead to the Grand Shrine.

It was originally located at present , on a sandbank at the confluence of the Kumano River and Otonashi River. In 1889, it was partially destroyed in a flood and the remaining shrine buildings were relocated at its present site in 1891. Of the original five main pavilions only three were rebuilt. Four deities were moved there and the other eight are still enshrined there in two stone monuments. 

In 2000, the largest torii shrine gate in the world (33.9 meters tall and 42 meters wide) was erected at the entrance to the Oyunohara sandbank. It is an official gateway that designates the entrance to a sacred area. It signifies the division of the secular and the spiritual worlds. This torii is called Otorii (o means "great") and is made of steel weighing 172 tons, which took about six months to make and another six months to assemble.

History 

Over 900 years ago a pilgrim wrote of a massive shrine grounds including five main pavilions enshrining 12 deities. Numerous other small temples and shrines could be found surrounding the main buildings. Over the centuries the pavilions were partially destroyed by periodic fires and flooding, but always faithfully rebuilt to their original state. The last fire was in 1776 and the buildings rebuilt again in 1803. The first drawing of the shrine grounds from over 800 years ago and the reconstruction that took place in 1803 are almost exactly identical. After the flood of 1889, the shrine pavilions were moved and rebuilt at their present location.

Architecture 
The Kumano Hongu Taisha's pavilions are an outstanding example of Japanese shrine architecture. The use of natural unfinished materials allows it to blend effortlessly into the natural environment. Intricate joint works were used in the construction instead of nails. The thick roof gracefully sweeps forward extending over the stairs and the area in front of the shrine. It is made entirely of hinoki, Japanese cypress bark. 

The bronze ornaments on the roof top are characteristic features of shrine architecture. The X-shaped crosspieces that pierce the sky are called Chigi and the log like beams that are laid horizontally along and perpendicular to the ridge line are called Katsuogi. They add a dramatic highlight to the roof line.

Unique to the Kumano Hongu Taisha is the space or corridor under the verandas of the pavilions. In the past, the pilgrims and ascetics would use this tiny refuge for meditation, prayer, sutra copying, austere rites and even sleeping quarters. In fact, this is where Saint Ippen Shonin was enlightened. The Kumano Hongu Taisha is a mixture between Kasuga and Taisha styles but because of this sacred corridor it has also been referred to as the Kumano style.

Festivals 
Kumano Hongu Taisha Spring Festival, the annual spring festival held 13–15 April every year is not only a quintessential festival of Kumano but also intimately associated with the pilgrimage to Kumano and the Kumano Kodo pilgrimage route. On April 13 fathers and their young sons purify themselves in the sacred waters of Yunomine Onsen before walking over the Dainichi-goe section of the Kumano Kodo pilgrimage route to Oyunohara wearing traditional costumes. The young boys have the character for big on their forehead and are forbidden to touch the ground. On April 15 the Kumano Deities are invoked to temporarily take up residence in a portable mikoshi shrine and returned to their original site of descend, Oyunohara. The atmosphere is serene, traditional, authentic and inspiring.

Yata-no-Hi Matsuri Fire Festival, taking place on the last Saturday of August, in Oyunohara (Hongu-cho), in honour of the Yatagarasu crow (three-legged crow). This fire festival includes the parading of a fire mikoshi, a Taiko drum show, dancing, and fireworks.

Access
Buses from:
West Japan Railway Company, Central Japan Railway Company Shingū Station on Kisei Main Line
JR-West Kii-Tanabe Station blues
Nanki–Shirahama Airport

References

External links
Wakayama World Heritage Center
Kumano Hongū Taisha Official Site (Japanese)
Kumano Sanzan Official Site (Japanese)

Beppyo shrines
Kanpei-taisha

Shinto shrines in Wakayama Prefecture
World Heritage Sites in Japan
Important Cultural Properties of Japan